In Makhanya v Minister of Finance (2001), an important case in the South African law of succession, the deceased (R) was a civil servant who was murdered by his wife.  In terms of the Governmental Services Act, his wife was entitled to receive his pension benefits.  R's daughter, however, approached the court to declare the deceased's wife unworthy of inheriting.  The court considered the question of whether the bloedige hand principle could be extended to statutory principles.  The court held that public policy dictates that the principle should not be limited and accordingly extended its application to the statute.

See also 
 Law of succession in South Africa

References 
 Makhanya v Minister of Finance and Others 2001 (2) SA 1251 (D).

Notes 

South African case law
2001 in South African law
2001 in case law